Lloyd Brown (born 1 January 1995) is a South African cricketer. He is a right-handed batsman. He made his first-class debut for Eastern Province against KwaZulu-Natal Inland.

References

External links
 

1995 births
Living people
South African cricketers
Eastern Province cricketers